Philosophia: Philosophical Quarterly of Israel is a peer-reviewed academic journal covering philosophy from different traditions that was established in 1971. The journal publishes five issues per year, and it is published by Springer Nature. The editors-in-chief are Asa Kasher (Tel Aviv University) and Mitchell Green (University of Connecticut).

Abstracting and indexing 
The journal is abstracted and indexed in:

External links 
 

Publications established in 1971
Philosophy journals
English-language journals
Springer Science+Business Media academic journals
Biannual journals